Store Styggehøe or Styggehøe is a mountain in Lom Municipality in Innlandet county, Norway. The mountain is surrounded by several other notable mountains including Galdhøpiggen, Svellnosbreahesten, and Midtre Tverråtinden to the northwest; Bukkehøe and Lindbergtinden to the west; Store Bukkeholstinden to the southwest;  Bukkeholshøe to the southeast; Leirhøi and Veobreahesten to the east; and Spiterhøi and Skauthøi to the northeast.

See also
List of mountains of Norway by height

References

Jotunheimen
Lom, Norway
Mountains of Innlandet